Aglaia korthalsii is a species of plant in the family Meliaceae. It is found in Bhutan, Brunei, India, Indonesia, Malaysia, the Philippines, and Thailand.

References

korthalsii
Near threatened plants
Taxonomy articles created by Polbot